Mascara is the capital city of Mascara Province, Algeria, in northwestern Algeria. It has 150,000 inhabitants (2008 estimate). It was founded in the 10th century by the Banu Ifran, a Berber tribe and was the capital city of Emir Abd al-Qadir, a leader of the Algerian resistance to early French colonial rule.

Mascara is an administrative, commercial and a market centre. Its trade is mostly centered on leather goods, grains, and olive oil, but it is especially famous for its good wine. It has good road and rail connections with other urban centres of Algeria.

Mascara has two parts, a newer French area, and an older Muslim one. Large parts of the town lie inside the ruins of its ancient ramparts. The city is home of Lakhdar Belloumi, the former Algerian football (soccer) star.

Etymology
The word mascara is the francisation of the Arabic word معسكر (mouaskar), meaning 'camp'. Due to French colonization at that time, the city's name has adopted the French version as an official name. The name mascara (cosmetic) was given in reference to the city of that bears the same name. In the middle of the 19th century, the French discovered antimony powder during their conquest in the old town of Mascara in Algeria. The nomadic tribes used it as a beauty product but also to protect themselves from various trachomas and eye diseases.

Ottoman period

 1701: Ottomans built a military garrison in the town. Many Muslims with Andalucian origins were settled there by the Ottomans.
1708: The Muslim tribes of Mascara led by the bey Mustapha Ben Youcef captured the city of Oran and expelled the Spaniards while they were busy in the War of the Spanish Succession.
1732: Spain regains control of Oran.
1790: Famine and sickness had begun to aggravate the situation in Oran when the bey of Mascara appeared before the town with 30,000 men. The Spanish commander held out till August 1791, when the Spanish government, having made terms with the bey of Algiers, was allowed to set sail for Spain with their guns and ammunition. The bey Mohammed took possession of Oran in March 1792, and made it his residence instead of Mascara.

French invasion and early French rule
 1832: Abd al-Qadir makes Mascara his headquarters.
 1835: Mascara is destroyed by the French.
 1841: The French establish full control over Mascara.

Algeria (sovereign state)
 August 18, 1994: An earthquake measuring 5.7 on the moment magnitude scale and having a maximum MSK intensity of VIII (Damaging) leaves 171 people dead in Mascara.

Twin towns/sister cities
Mascara is twinned with:
 Bursa, Turkey
 Elkader, Iowa, United States
 Tifariti, Saharawi Arab Democratic Republic

References 

 
Communes of Mascara Province
Province seats of Algeria
Populated places established in 1701
Algeria
Cities in Algeria